Aughrim Rugby was officially founded on 3 February 2011 in Aughrim, County Wicklow, Ireland. Otherwise known as Aughrim RFC or The Red Kites. 

During the previous year of 2010 research had been carried out on primary and secondary schools throughout South County Wicklow to see if it could recruit and put together a sustainable rugby club. As of March 2011 Aughrim Rugbys Schools Partner Program consists of 7 primary schools.

The Aughrim Rugby logo is based on the red kite bird of prey which was re-introduced to the Wicklow hills starting in 2007. The club colours for the jersey are royal blue and white linings; the shorts are royal blue; and socks are royal blue and white linings.

Aughrim Rugby will initially cater for mini rugby up to the age of under 12's (season: 2011/2012). Youths rugby will follow during season 2012/2013.

As a new club Aughrim Rugby's medium term plan throughout year one was to appoint volunteers via their volunteer management program. Key positions Child Welfare Officer(s), Coach Development Officer(s), Volunteer Coordinator(s), Schools Liaison Officer(s), Player Recruitment Officer(s) and Club Development Officer(s)have been filled based on previous skills in business and sporting acumen.

On 2 April 2011 Aughrim Rugby held its launch day with over 96 children registering to play for Aughrim Rugby.

On 12 April Aughrim Rugby was fully accredited to the IRFU and the Leinster Branch of the IRFU. Officially Aughrim Rugby is Ireland's newest rugby club.

Aughrim Rugby was one of several lucky clubs to be nominated for funding via Ulster Bank Rugbyforce in 2011.

On 26 December 2011 Aughrim Rugby played at half time during the RaboDirectPro12 match between Leinster and Ulster at the RDS Arena in front of a sell out crowd of 20,000.

Shane Byrne was born and raised in Aughrim. Shane played for Leinster, Saracens, British & Irish Lions and won over 40 caps for Ireland. He is of course a big supporter of Aughrim Rugby.

References

Rugby union clubs in County Wicklow
Rugby clubs established in 2011